The Duke of Reichstadt is a 1931 French-German historical drama film directed by Viktor Tourjansky and starring Walter Edthofer, Lien Deyers and Grete Natzler. It is the German-language version of the French film The Eaglet, based on the play L'Aiglon by Edmond Rostand. It takes its name from the formal Austrian title of Napoleon II, its central character.

It was shot at the Joinville Studios in Paris and on location around Vienna. The film's sets were designed by the art director Serge Piménoff.

Cast
  Walter Edthofer as Herzog von Reichstadt
 Lien Deyers as Maria Louise
 Grete Natzler as Fanny Elssler
 Alfred Abel as Hofrat Gentz
 Kitty Aschenbach  as Herzogin v. Parma
 Margarethe Hruby as Gräfin Camerata
 Eugen Klöpfer as Grenadier Flambeau
 Erwin Kalser as Kanzler Fürst Metternich
 Ekkehard Arendt as Major v. Prokesch
 Jaro Fürth as Kaiser Franz I.
 Eugen Jensen as Graf Sedlnitzky
 Eugen Burg as Graf Bombelles
 Kurt Ehrle as Marschall Marmont
 John Mylong as Tiburce de Lorget
 Hans Heinrich von Twardowski
 Alfred Beierle
 Gertrud Kanitz

References

Bibliography 
 Goble, Alan. The Complete Index to Literary Sources in Film. Walter de Gruyter, 1999.
 Klaus, Ulrich J. Deutsche Tonfilme: Jahrgang 1931. Klaus-Archiv, 1988.

External links 
 

1931 films
German historical films
French historical films
1930s historical films
1930s German-language films
Films of the Weimar Republic
Films directed by Victor Tourjansky
Films set in the 1810s
Films set in the 1820s
Films set in the 1830s
German multilingual films
German black-and-white films
Films based on works by Edmond Rostand
Cultural depictions of Klemens von Metternich
1931 multilingual films
Films set in the Austrian Empire
1930s German films
1930s French films
Films shot at Joinville Studios
Films shot in Vienna
Films set in Vienna